Pauliström is a locality situated in Vetlanda Municipality, Jönköping County, Sweden with 221 inhabitants in 2010.

Photo gallery

References 

Populated places in Jönköping County
Populated places in Vetlanda Municipality